Oleksandr Hranovskyi (born July 31, 1972 in Uman, Ukraine), is a Ukrainian businessperson, shareholder at Vertex United.

Education 

 Odessa University, Faculty of Law.
 National Academy for Public Administration under the President of Ukraine

Business 

, Oleksandr Hranovskyi is a co-owner of Vertex United, holding company managing the following assets: 
 Finance: PJSC “FinBank”.
 Hotel business (4-5-star hotels): President Hotel, Bristol Hotel, Londonskaya Hotel, other hospitality objects.

Controversy 
Oleksandr was reported to have been arrested in the month of December 2022, for being "suspected of creating organized criminal group (OCG) together with businessman Borys Kaufman in Odesa." This occurred about 48 hours after he was tried in absentia.

Finances 
Oleksandr Hranovskyi four times fell into the rating of the "Focus" magazine "200 richest people of Ukraine" (in 2009, 2010, 2011, 2012).

According to the results of 2013, Oleksandr Hranovskyi's estate was valued at 87.5 million dollars.

Activity timeline 

He was not elected in the 2019 Ukrainian parliamentary election after losing his constituency in Kharkiv with 15% of the votes.

References

1972 births
Living people
People from Uman
Ukrainian businesspeople
Fourth convocation members of the Verkhovna Rada